Club Deportivo Fútbol Tres Cantos is a Spanish football team based in Tres Cantos, Community of Madrid. Founded in 2005, it plays in Tercera División RFEF – Group 7, holding home matches at Campo Municipal de Fútbol La Foresta A.

History
Founded in 2005 as a merger between CD Tres Cantos Balompié and CD Embarcaciones, Tres Cantos achieved immediate promotion to Primera Categoría in its first season. In 2008, after a fusion with CD La Paz, the club achieved an administrative promotion to Preferente Autonómica.

Tres Cantos achieved promotion to Tercera División in June 2017, after finishing third in the regular season. On 4 July of the following year, the club became CF Rayo Majadahonda's reserve team, after an agreement between both sides was reached.

In April 2020, after Rayo Majadahonda announced an affiliation with CD Paracuellos Antamira (formerly Alcobendas Sport), the agreement with Tres Cantos was cancelled.

Season to season

2 seasons in Tercera División
1 season in Tercera División RFEF

Notes

References

External links
 
Soccerway team profile

Football clubs in the Community of Madrid
Association football clubs established in 2005
2005 establishments in Spain
CF Rayo Majadahonda